The following tables list the point distributions used in the FedEx Cup during the regular season and playoffs, as well as the playoff reset element of the FedEx Cup. Various distribution seen below were in effect from 2007 to 2016. The current distributions are at list of point distributions of the FedEx Cup.

Regular point distribution
Only golfers who make the first cut for an event will receive points for that event.  In case of a two-cut system (used if 78 or more players make the cut after two rounds), the low 70 and ties advance to the final round, and players who do not advance to the fourth round after the second cut receive points.  At the AT&T Pebble Beach National Pro-Am, where only 60 players make the cut after three rounds, players in the standings who do not make the cut and are between 61st and 70th (and ties) will also receive points. In case of a tie, point totals are added together and divided among all golfers tied for a particular position at the end of a tournament. For example, if four golfers finish tied for fifth place, the fifth through eighth place points are summed and divided by four, with each of the golfers receiving the same number of points.

Playoff reset
In 2007 and 2008, after the Wyndham Championship, players who are in the top 144 have their points increased with respect to the following chart, the equivalent of "seeding" the players. Players who have performed better during the regular season (and thus, have more points) will more likely advance past the first event in the playoffs. The points on the reset scale will carry over into the playoffs.

The points table was modified for the 2008 season, compressing the points spreads, in an effort to create more volatility in the playoffs.

Beginning in 2009, the points from the regular season carry-over to the first three playoff tournaments (which carry five times the points as the regular season tournaments). The points are reset for The Tour Championship according to the table below. Starting with the 2015 playoffs, the playoff events were only worth four times as many points as standard regular season events, and the points reset for the Tour Championship was modified accordingly.

Playoff point distribution 
Only golfers who make the cut for an event will receive points for that event.

The points table was modified for the 2008 season, increasing the points awarded, in an effort to create more volatility in the playoffs.

From 2009 through 2014, all playoff events carry the same points, which are five times the points for a regular season event. For the 2015 and 2016 playoffs, the playoff events were reduced to only four times the points of a regular season event.

Prize fund distribution
The top 150 golfers in the final FedEx standings receive prize money. Most of this money is placed into tax-deferred retirement accounts, however finishers in the top ten receive their prize as a split of immediate cash and retirement accounts. The table below shows the combined amount for those places. Since 2019, the results for the top 30 finishers have been determined by the Tour Championship itself, with ties handled in the customary manner (for instance, in 2020, Justin Thomas and Xander Schauffele tied for second, and each received $4,500,000.

All amounts in the below table are in thousands of United States dollars.

References

FedEx Cup